Mark Philippoussis was the defending champion, but lost in the second round this year.

Thomas Enqvist won the title, defeating Andre Agassi 6–7(4–7), 7–6(8–6), 6–3 in the final.

Seeds

  Greg Rusedski (first round)
  Jonas Björkman (quarterfinals)
  Gustavo Kuerten (second round)
  Tim Henman (second round)
  Mark Philippoussis (second round)
  Sergi Bruguera (first round)
  Thomas Enqvist (champion)
  Andre Agassi (final)

Draw

Finals

Top half

Bottom half

External links
 1998 BMW Open Singles draw

Singles